The following highways are numbered 602:

Canada
 Alberta Highway 602
 Ontario Highway 602

Costa Rica
 National Route 602

United Kingdom
  A602 road - Hertfordshire
  M602 motorway - Salford

United States
 Louisiana Highway 602
 Louisiana Highway 602-1
 Louisiana Highway 602-2
 Nevada State Route 602
 Ohio State Route 602
 Pennsylvania Route 602 (former)
 Puerto Rico Highway 602
 
Virginia State Route 602 (1928-1933) (now US 17)